Nicola Benedetti (born 26 December 1985) is an Italian modern pentathlete. He competed at the 2008 and 2012 Summer Olympics. At the London 2012 Olympics, Benedetti set a world record time of 9:23.63 in the running element.

References

External links
 

1985 births
Living people
Italian male modern pentathletes
Olympic modern pentathletes of Italy
Modern pentathletes at the 2008 Summer Olympics
Modern pentathletes at the 2012 Summer Olympics
Sportspeople from Modena
World Modern Pentathlon Championships medalists
20th-century Italian people
21st-century Italian people